Middle Creek Dam is located at the head waters of Plane Creek west of Sarina, Queensland. It was constructed in the late 1950s-early 1960s by the Sarina Shire Council and Plane Creek Sugar Mill to augment water supply from two weirs downstream that had been built in 1926 and 1935. It has a small catchment of 7.4 square kilometres and a capacity of 1,120 megalitres. The dam is used for water skiing by the Sarina Ski Club. The dam wall and spillway were upgraded by Mackay Regional Council in 2015 to improve flood capacity.

See also

List of dams and reservoirs in Australia

References

Reservoirs in Queensland
Dams in Queensland
Buildings and structures in Central Queensland